Michael Steveen Estrada Martínez (born 7 April 1996) is an Ecuadorian footballer who plays as a forward for Liga MX club Cruz Azul, on loan from Toluca, and the Ecuador national team.

Career

Club
Estrada started his career with Macará, making his senior debut in the Ecuadorian Serie A on 10 March 2013 in a 1–0 loss against Barcelona.
After three seasons with Macara's first team, Estrada joined El Nacional. He made his debut on 7 February 2016, scoring in a 2–1 win over Barcelona.

In December 2019, Estrada joined Liga MX side Toluca.

On 8 February 2022, Estrada moved to Major League Soccer side D.C. United on a season-long loan. Estrada debuted for United's 2022 season opener against Charlotte FC on 26 February, scoring 2 goals in the 3–0 win. In August, Estrada and the club mutually terminated the loan, and he returned to Toluca after scoring four goals in 16 league appearances.

Shortly thereafter, Estrada joined Cruz Azul on a year-long loan with an option to buy. He made his debut on 17 August in a 2–1 defeat to Tijuana.

International
On 14 November, Estrada was named in Ecuador's 26-man squad for the 2022 FIFA World Cup. He would start in the opening match of the group stage, a 2–0 win over Qatar.

Career statistics

Club

International

Scores and results list Ecuador's goal tally first, score column indicates score after each Estrada goal.

See also

 All-time D.C. United roster
 List of Ecuadorians
 List of foreign Liga MX players
 List of foreign MLS players

References

External links

 
 
 
 
 

1996 births
Living people
Ecuadorian footballers
Sportspeople from Guayaquil
Association football forwards
C.S.D. Macará footballers
C.D. El Nacional footballers
C.S.D. Independiente del Valle footballers
Deportivo Toluca F.C. players
D.C. United players
Cruz Azul footballers
Ecuadorian Serie A players
Ecuadorian Serie B players
Liga MX players
Major League Soccer players
Ecuador international footballers
2021 Copa América players
2022 FIFA World Cup players
Ecuadorian expatriate footballers
Expatriate footballers in Mexico
Ecuadorian expatriate sportspeople in Mexico
Expatriate soccer players in the United States
Ecuadorian expatriate sportspeople in the United States